The Speedway Champions Cup was an annual motorcycle speedway competition that took place between 1986 and 1993, featuring the national champions of the sixteen participating nations. It was discontinued with the introduction of the Speedway Grand Prix in 1995.

The 1992 championship was held at Rovno and the winner was Gert Handberg of Denmark.

Results

August 2, 1992
 Rovno

References

Speedway Champions Cup
Champions Cup
Speedway
International sports competitions hosted by Ukraine